was a Japanese football player. He played for Japan national team.

Club career
Harada played for Osaka SC was founded by his alma mater high school graduates and many Japan national team players Kiyoo Kanda, Shiro Azumi, Usaburo Hidaka, Toshio Hirabayashi, Setsu Sawagata, Kikuzo Kisaka, Yoshio Fujiwara and Shumpei Inoue were playing in those days.

National team career
In May 1923, Harada was selected Japan national team for 1923 Far Eastern Championship Games in Osaka. At this competition, on May 23, he debuted against Philippines. This match is Japan team first match in International A Match. Next day, he also played against Republic of China. But Japan lost in both matches (1-2, v Philippines and 1-5, v Republic of China). He played 2 games for Japan in 1923. He was also selected Japan for 1925 Far Eastern Championship Games, but he did not compete, as he was the team's reserve goalkeeper behind Yanosuke Watanabe.

National team statistics

References

External links
 
 Japan National Football Team Database

Year of birth missing
Year of death missing
Japanese footballers
Japan international footballers
Association football goalkeepers